State Route 64 (SR-64) is a state highway in the U.S. state of Utah that serves as a connection from US-50 in the town of Holden to I-15, which bypasses the town. The route is a remnant of old US-91, bypassed by I-15.

Route description
The road begins from the ramps connecting exit 174 on I-15 and heads northwest, and then turns northeast on the west-side frontage road, continuing north to serve as the Main Street of Holden. At the northern outskirts of the town, the highway terminates at US-50.

History
Holden's Main Street became a state highway in 1910 as part of the main road south-southwesterly from Salt Lake City. It was numbered as part of SR-1 and US-91 in the 1920s. In 1969, with the construction of I-15 imminent, State Route 26 (now US-50), which had ended at SR-1 just north of Holden, was extended both north and south from its eastern end to meet I-15 on both sides of the bypass. The state legislature redesignated the southern half as SR-64 in 1975, about a year before I-15 was completed in the area.

Major intersections

References

064
 064
Streets in Utah